Just Coolin' may refer to:

 "Just Coolin'" (song), a 1989 song collaboration between LeVert and Heavy D
 Just Coolin' (album), an album by LeVert